White Winds is Andreas Vollenweider's fourth studio album, released in 1984.

On his official website, Vollenweider says: "The making of 'White Winds' was like a creative harvest time. Reactions from the 'outside world' had made us more confident and more courageous, but also a bit looser. Even the song title of 'Flight Feet & Root Hands' mirrors our frame of mind: freely 'flying' feet - and our hands firmly rooted in the earth."

Musician reviewer J. D. Considine wrote: "Don't call this 'mood music' unless you consider sleep a mood."

Reception

Track listing
"The White Winds/The White Boat (First View)" - 1:49
"Hall of the Stairs/Hall of the Mosaics (Meeting You)" (feat. Elena Ledda) - 5:06
"The Glass Hall (Choose the Crystal)/The Play of the Five Balls/The Five Planets/Canopy Choir" - 7:38
"The Woman and the Stone" - 4:25
"The Stone (Close-up)" - 3:01
"Phases of the Three Moons" - 2:46
"Flight Feet & Root Hands" - 3:39
"Brothership" - 3:22
"Sisterseed" - 1:33
"Trilogy (At the White Magic Gardens)/The White Winds" - 3:24

Charts

References

Andreas Vollenweider albums
1984 albums
CBS Records albums